In India, a Chief Minister is the elected head of government of each state out of the 28 states and sometimes a union territory (UT). Currently, only the UTs of Delhi, Jammu and Kashmir (currently vacant) and Puducherry have serving chief ministers. According to the Constitution of India, the governor is a state's head, but de facto executive authority rests with the chief minister. 

Following elections to the State legislative assembly or Vidhan Sabha in a state, the state's governor usually invites the party (or coalition) with a majority of seats to form the government. The governor appoints and swears in the chief minister, whose council of ministers are collectively responsible to the assembly. Based on the Westminster system, given that they retain the confidence of the assembly, the chief minister's term can last for the length of the assembly's life, a maximum of five years. There are no limits to the number of terms that the chief minister can serve. A chief minister heads a state government's council of ministers and can be deputised in that role by a deputy chief minister. The chief minister generally selects the chief secretary and can also allot departments to the cabinet ministers of their state and ministers of state. They also direct the chief secretary to transfer, suspend, or promote officers of their state.

Selection process

Eligibility 
The Constitution of India sets the principle qualifications one must meet to be eligible to the office of chief minister. A chief minister must be:

 a citizen of India. 
 should be a member of the state legislature
 of 25 years of age or more

An individual who is not a member of the legislature can be considered the chief minister provided they get themselves elected to the State Legislature within six months from the date of their appointment. Failing which, they would cease to be the chief minister.

Election 
The chief minister is elected through a majority in the state legislative assembly. This is procedurally established by the vote of confidence in the legislative assembly, as suggested by the governor of the state who is the appointing authority. They are elected for five years.  The chief minister shall hold office during the pleasure of the governor.

Oath 
Since, according to the constitution, the chief minister is appointed by the governor, the swearing in is done before the governor of the state.

The oath of office 

The oath of secrecy

Resignation 
In the event of a chief minister's resignation, which conventionally occurs after a general election or during a phase of assembly majority transition, the outgoing chief minister holds the informal title of "caretaker" chief minister until the governor either appoints a new chief minister or dissolves the assembly. Since the post is not constitutionally defined, the caretaker chief minister enjoys all the powers a regular chief minister, but cannot to make any major policy decisions or cabinet changes during his or her short tenure as caretaker.

Remuneration 

By Article 164 of the constitution of India, remuneration of the chief minister as well as other ministers are to be decided by the respective state legislatures. Until the legislature of the state decides salary, it shall be as specified in the second schedule.
The salaries thus vary from state to state.

Deputy chief minister 

Various states throughout the history have appointed deputy chief ministers. Despite being not mentioned in the constitution or law, the deputy-chief minister office is often used to pacify factions within the party or coalition. It is similar to the rarely used deputy-prime minister post in the central government of India. During the absence of the chief minister, the deputy-chief minister may chair cabinet meetings and lead the assembly majority. Various deputy chief ministers have also taken the oath of secrecy in line with the one that chief minister takes. This oath has also sparked controversies.

See also 
 List of female Chief Ministers in India
 List of longest-ruling Indian chief ministers
 List of current Indian chief ministers
 List of current Indian deputy chief ministers
 Federalism in India

References 

Heads of government